Heishizi Station is a station on Line 4 of Chongqing Rail Transit in Chongqing municipality, China. It is located in Jiangbei District and opened in 2018.

Station structure
There are 2 island platforms at this station, but only 2 outer platforms are used for Local trains to stop, with Express trains passing through the middle tracks.

References

Railway stations in Chongqing
Railway stations in China opened in 2018
Chongqing Rail Transit stations